Palmira Airport  is an airstrip serving the Palmira region of the Bolivian pampa in the Beni Department of Bolivia.

See also

Transport in Bolivia
List of airports in Bolivia

References

External links 
OpenStreetMap - Palmira Airport
OurAirports - Palmira Airport
FallingRain - Palmira Airport
Google Maps - Palmira Airport

Airports in Beni Department